Crane Mother is a fictional character appearing in American comic books published by Marvel Comics.

Fictional character biography
Crane Mother was the ruler of K'un-Zi, one of the Legendary Cities of Heaven. In 1933, a meeting took place with all seven lords where she accused Iron Fist (Orson Randall) of sullying tradition because he refused to participate in the Tournament of the Heavenly Cities. In each city, an immortal weapon, such as the Iron Fist, fights for his city in the tournament. The battles in the tournament decide the order of the cities of the heavenly timeline. All council members except Lord Tuan, the leader of K'un-Lun agreed that Randall should pay and face punishment. Randall would be confronted by the Immortal Weapons and he ended up killing Davos  the Immortal Weapon of Ku'n-Zi. Randall would elude capture and Crane Mother had a personal vendetta against him ever since.

In other media
Although the Crane Mother hasn't appeared in the Marvel Cinematic Universe series Iron Fist, there is a K'un-L'un organization called the Order of the Crane Mother that appears in a flashback in the episode "The City's Not for Burning."

References

External links
 Crane Mother at Marvel Wiki

Marvel Comics female superheroes
Characters created by Ed Brubaker
Characters created by Matt Fraction
Comics characters introduced in 2007
Iron Fist (comics)